The Binary Independence Model (BIM) in computing and information science is a probabilistic information retrieval technique. The model makes some simple assumptions to make the estimation of document/query similarity probable and feasible.

Definitions 
The Binary Independence Assumption is that documents are binary vectors. That is, only the presence or absence of terms in documents are recorded. Terms are independently distributed in the set of relevant documents and they are also independently distributed in the set of irrelevant documents.
The representation is an ordered set of Boolean variables. That is, the representation of a document or query is a vector with one Boolean element for each term under consideration. More specifically, a document is represented by a vector  where  if term t is present in the document d and  if it's not. Many documents can have the same vector representation with this simplification. Queries are represented in a similar way.
"Independence" signifies that terms in the document are considered independently from each other and  no association between terms is modeled. This assumption is very limiting, but it has been shown that it gives good enough results for many situations. This independence is the "naive" assumption of a Naive Bayes classifier, where properties that imply each other are nonetheless treated as independent for the sake of simplicity. This assumption allows the representation to be treated as an instance of a Vector space model by considering each term as a value of 0 or 1 along a dimension orthogonal to the dimensions used for the other terms.

The probability  that a document is relevant derives from the probability of relevance of the terms vector of that document . By using the Bayes rule we get:

 

If so, then that document's representation is x.
The exact probabilities can not be known beforehand, so estimates from statistics about the collection of documents must be used.

 and  indicate the previous probability of retrieving a relevant or nonrelevant document respectively for a query q. If, for instance, we knew the percentage of relevant documents in the collection, then we could use it to estimate these probabilities.
Since a document is either relevant or nonrelevant to a query we have that:

Query Terms Weighting 
Given a binary query and the dot product as the similarity function between a document and a query, the problem is to assign weights to the
terms in the query such that the retrieval effectiveness will be high. Let  and  be the probability that a relevant document and an irrelevant document has the  term respectively.
of term  will be higher than that of term . Yu and Salton showed that such a weight assignment to query terms yields better retrieval effectiveness than if query terms are equally weighted.

The Binary Independence Model was introduced by Yu and Salton. The name Binary Independence Model was coined by Robertson and Spärck Jones who used the log-odds probability of the probabilistic relevance model to derive  where the log-odds probability is shown to be rank equivalent to the probability of relevance (i.e.) by Luk, obeying the probability ranking principle.

See also 

 Bag of words model

Further reading

References 

Information retrieval techniques
Probabilistic models